

429001–429100 

|-id=031
| 429031 Hannavonhoerner ||  || Hanna von Hoerner (1942–2014) was a German astrophysicist and space entrepreneur. After studying physics at Heidelberg University she founded a company involved in the development of space instrumentation, primarily for solar system missions, such as Rosetta's COSIMA mass spectrometer || 
|-id=032
| 429032 Sebvonhoerner ||  || Sebastian von Hoerner (1919–2003) was a German astrophysicist and radio astronomer. After graduation and habilitation at Heidelberg he moved to the Green Bank radio observatory, contributing to the optimisation of radio telescope designs. He became one of the pioneers of the search for extraterrestrial intelligence || 
|-id=033
| 429033 Günterwendt ||  || Günter Wendt (1924–2010) was a German aeronautical engineer. After World War II he moved to the US and joined the crewed spaceflight program. He was pad leader during the Mercury, Gemini, Apollo and Skylab missions and was the person who closed the spacecraft hatch and bade farewell to launching astronauts || 
|-id=084
| 429084 Dietrichrex ||  || Dietrich Rex (1934–2016), a German physicist, university professor and head of the Spaceflight and Reactor Technology Institute of the Brunswick University of Technology. || 
|}

429101–429200 

|-id=120
| 429120 Mikhaillavrov ||  || Mikhail Ivanovich Lavrov (1927–2002) was an astrophysicist and a professor at Kazan University. He was a brilliant teacher of practical astrophysics, researcher on eclipsing binary stars, and one of the pioneers of computer analysis and modeling of light curves in the 1970s. || 
|-id=136
| 429136 Corsali ||  || Andrea Corsali (1487–?) was an Italian explorer who traveled to Asia and the south seas aboard a Portuguese merchant vessel. He identified, located, illustrated and named the constellation now known as the Southern Cross. || 
|}

429201–429300 

|-bgcolor=#f2f2f2
| colspan=4 align=center | 
|}

429301–429400 

|-bgcolor=#f2f2f2
| colspan=4 align=center | 
|}

429401–429500 

|-bgcolor=#f2f2f2
| colspan=4 align=center | 
|}

429501–429600 

|-bgcolor=#f2f2f2
| colspan=4 align=center | 
|}

429601–429700 

|-bgcolor=#f2f2f2
| colspan=4 align=center | 
|}

429701–429800 

|-bgcolor=#f2f2f2
| colspan=4 align=center | 
|}

429801–429900 

|-bgcolor=#f2f2f2
| colspan=4 align=center | 
|}

429901–430000 

|-bgcolor=#f2f2f2
| colspan=4 align=center | 
|}

References 

429001-430000